Sam or Samuel Strong may refer to:

People 
 Sam Strong (director), Australian theatre director
 Sam Strong (soccer), American soccer player
 Samuel Strong, Vermont politician and militia officer
 Samuel Henry Strong, former Chief Justice of Canada and lawyer

Places 
 Gen. Samuel Strong House, located on West Main Street in Vergennes, Vermont
 Samuel Paddock Strong House, located on 94 West Main Street in Vergennes, Vermont